The Leader of the Opposition is an unofficial title held by the leader of the largest party not within the government.

The Opposition in Hungary is the body of political parties represented in the parliament which are not a part of the government supported by the parliamentary majority.

History
The Leader of the Opposition is normally the leader of the largest party not within the government, which is usually the second largest political party in the National Assembly.

Following the first democratic election in 1990 after the end of communism, Alliance of Free Democrats (SZDSZ) suffered a close defeat, thus becoming the leading opposition force in the parliament. After the fall of the conservative government at the following 1994 parliamentary election, SZDSZ, the second largest party, surprised many by entering into a coalition with the Hungarian Socialist Party (MSZP), which achieved a remarkable revival, winning an overall majority of 209 seats out of 386. Thus Hungarian Democratic Forum (MDF), only with 38 MPs became the largest opposition party, while the government had a two-thirds majority.

On 4 March 1996, 15 MPs left MDF and formed Hungarian Democratic People's Party (MDNP), as a result agrarian right-wing Independent Smallholders, Agrarian Workers and Civic Party (FKgP) became the largest opposition party. By 1997, several parliamentarians had joined the Fidesz, mainly from the disintegrating Christian Democratic People's Party (KDNP). The Fidesz became the main challenger to the socialist-liberal cabinet.

From 1998 until 2010, there was a de facto two-party system in Hungary. MSZP suffered a heavy defeat in the 2010 election (won by Fidesz with a two-thirds majority), gaining only 19,3% of the votes, and 59 seats in the parliament, nevertheless the Socialists were able to maintain their leading role in the opposition, while Hungarian politics became a dominant-party system. The 2014 parliamentary election confirmed this position. Socialist Party Gyula Molnár was the Leader of the Opposition from 25 June 2016 to 2018. After Jobbik became the largest opposition party in the 2018 parliamentary election, the unofficial title belonged to Tamás Sneider, from 2018 to 2020 when he was replaced at Jobbik's Congress by Péter Jakab who has held the post until the next election, when the Democratic Coalition became the largest opposition party.

List of leaders of the Opposition

See also
Politics of Hungary

References

Politics of Hungary
Hungary